Fernando Cazón Vera is an Ecuadorian poet and journalist. He was born in Quito. Upon the death of his father, he moved with his mother to live in Guayaquil, where he studied at the Colegio Vicente Rocafuerte and then the University of Guayaquil. 

He worked for several Ecuadorian newspapers and magazines, among them La Hora; he was lately a columnist for the Guayaquil newspapers Expreso and Extra. He was also a university professor for fifteen years. He published numerous poetry collections during his career. He was associated with the literary  group Madrugada which also included figures such as Efraín Jara Idrovo, Jorge Enrique Adoum, Hugo Salazar Tamariz, etc. 

He received awards from the Municipality of Guayaquil and the Guayaquil Journalists Association. The Ecuadorian House of Culture published an extensive anthology of his poetic work (1958-2000) in the Poesía Junta collection. 

In 2018, he received the Premio Eugenio Espejo, the country's most important literary award.

Poetry
 Las canciones salvadas (1957)
 El enviado (1958) 
 La guitarra rota (1967) 
 La misa (1967)
 El extraño (1968)
 Poemas comprometidos (1972)
 El libro de las paradojas (1976)
 El hijo pródigo (1977)
 Las canciones salvadas (antología, 1980)
 La pájara pinta (1984)
 Rompecabezas (1986)
 Este pequeño mundo (1996)
 Cuando el río suena (1996)
 A fuego lento (1998)
 Relevo de prueba (2005) 
 La sombra degollada (2006)

References

Ecuadorian poets